Bea Alonzo is a Filipino actress who made her screen debut in the 2002 teen series K2BU. At the age of 15, she had her breakthrough role as a lawyer in the drama series Kay Tagal Kang Hinintay (2002), for which she received her first Star Awards for Best Actress nomination. The following year, Alonzo made her film debut in the romantic comedy My First Romance alongside John Lloyd Cruz. She co-starred with Cruz in a string of releases, including the romantic dramas Now That I Have You (2004), All About Love (2006), and Close to You (2006). They both had starring roles in the television series It Might Be You (2003), Ikaw ang Lahat sa Akin (2005), and Maging Sino Ka Man (2006). She then played Jinkee Pacquiao opposite Jericho Rosales in the Joel Lamangan-directed biographical drama Pacquiao: The Movie (2006).

Alonzo received critical acclaim for her role as Basha, a woman in a loveless and controlling relationship in the romantic drama One More Chance (2007), which earned her nominations at the FAMAS and Luna Awards for Best Actress. The following year, she played the titular character in the comedy series I Love Betty La Fea (2008), based on the Colombian telenovela Yo soy Betty, la fea. In 2010, she portrayed Corazon Aquino, the first female president of the Philippines, in the anthology series Maalaala Mo Kaya. During this period, Alonzo appeared in several television projects; she played a fashion designer in Magkaribal (2010), a woman seeking answers for her fiancé's death in Guns and Roses (2011), and an heiress in A Beautiful Affair (2012). She received Star Award nominations for Best Actress for her performances as an adulteress torn between her lover and his son in the drama The Mistress (2012), and as one of the siblings attempting to thwart her brother from getting married in the ensemble film Four Sisters and a Wedding (2013).

For her portrayal of dual roles in the revenge drama series Sana Bukas pa ang Kahapon (2014), Alonzo won the KBP Golden Dove Award for Best Actress. In 2015, she reprised her role as Basha in the sequel A Second Chance, her highest-grossing release, for which she won the Star Award for Best Actress. She went on to play a young stepmother in the family drama series A Love to Last (2017), appeared opposite Aga Muhlach in Paul Sorianos romance drama First Love (2018), and starred in the horror thriller Eerie (2019). She will play leading roles in the adaptations of the South Korean series Start-Up and the South Korean romantic drama A Moment to Remember.

Film

Television

References

External links
 

Actress filmographies
Philippine filmographies